Abdoulaye Sékou Sow (1931 – 27 May 2013) was a Malian politician who served as Prime Minister of Mali from 12 April 1993 to 4 February 1994 under President Alpha Oumar Konaré.

Career 

Sow was director of the École Nationale d'Administration. He was a founding member of the Alliance for Democracy in Mali-African Party for Solidarity and Justice (ADEMA-Pasj). President Konaré appointed him as Minister of Defense and Prime Minister in 1993. He held this post from April 1993 to February 1994.

In 2008, he published "The State Democratic Republican: the problem of its construction in Mali", edited by Grandvaux raising controversy in Mali in the management of revolts of 1993.

Sow died in Bamako on 27 May 2013.

References

1931 births
2013 deaths
Prime Ministers of Mali
Alliance for Democracy in Mali politicians
21st-century Malian people